Forrester is a surname of Anglo/Norman origin, referring to a forester. Notable people with the surname include:

 Alexander Forrester (politician) (–1787), British barrister and politician
 Alistair Forrester, Scottish darts player
 Billy Forrester, English footballer
 Bruce M. Forrester (1908-1995), Judge of the United States Tax Court
 Andrew Forrester, pseudonym of British novelist James Redding Ware
 Cay Forrester, American film and television actress
 Dia Forrester, Attorney General of Grenada 2020
 Douglas Forrester (born 1953), American businessman
 Gary Forrester, New Zealand musician, novelist, and poet
 George Forrester (disambiguation), various people
 Helen Forrester, English author
 Jack Forrester (1894–1964), Scottish-American professional golfer
 James Forrester (politician)
 James Forrester (rugby union)
 James H. Forrester (1870–1928), American lawyer, judge, and politician
 Jay Wright Forrester (1918–2016), founder of the study of system dynamics
 Joel Forrester, composer
 Joseph James Forrester (1809–1861), English businessman in Portugal
 Katrina Forrester (born 1986), English political theorist and historian
 Maureen Forrester (1930-2010), Canadian singer
 Patrick Graham Forrester (born 1957), American army officer and astronaut
 Philippa Forrester, English media personality
 Stephanie Forrester (triathlete)
 Tony Forrester, English bridge player and writer
 Viviane Forrester (1925–2013), French writer

Fictional
 Doctor Clayton Forrester (War of the Worlds)
 Dr. Clayton Forrester (Myster Science Theater 3000)
 Lee Forrester, comic book character
 Maryann Forrester, True Blood
 Pearl Forrester, Mystery Science Theater 3000
 The Forrester family on The Bold and the Beautiful
 William Forrester, Finding Forrester (film)

See also
 Forester (disambiguation)
 Forster (disambiguation)
 Foster (disambiguation)
 Forrest (disambiguation)

Surnames of Lowland Scottish origin
Occupational surnames
English-language occupational surnames